The Nissan E series name was used on two types of automobile engines. The first was an OHV line used in the late 1950s and throughout the 1960s. It was replaced by the GA engine series.

First series
The first E-series of engines was one of Nissan's earliest homegrown designs, although being essentially an enlargement of the earlier Nissan C engine. It did not use the same nomenclature of the later Nissan engines, with all models sharing the same displacement and simply called "E". It displaced  from a  bore and stroke. This E series was produced from 1958 through the late 1960s, yet not before becoming the basis of the Nissan J engine that was distantly different from the E and earlier C engines (whose roots stem from the Nissan 1H engine, a licence built 1.5 BMC B-Series) yet similar in many ways. 

Applications:
 E
 1958 Datsun Bluebird (211)
 1959 Datsun Bluebird (310)
 1959 Datsun Truck 222
 1960 Datsun Fairlady SP212
 E-1
 1960–1962 Datsun Bluebird (311)
 1962–1964 Datsun Bluebird (312)
 1964–May 1965 Datsun Bluebird (410/411)
 1961 Datsun Fairlady SP213
 1961 Datsun Pickup 223
 1962-1965 Datsun Pickup 320
 1968-1969 Datsun Cabstar A320

Second series
The second type of E engines was a single overhead cam design, used to replace the OHV A series. The SOHC head was a new aluminum alloy design fitted to a cast iron block. It was derived from the A series by simply fitting a belt drive pulley to the nose of the crankshaft. The jackshaft being in place of the OHV camshaft still drove the oil pump as before. The E-series engine was first introduced in 1981 on the N10 Pulsar/Cherry series, and shortly afterwards on the B11 Sentra/Sunny models. The E-series was gradually replaced by the GA-series in 1988/89, although it soldiered on in secondary markets such as Southeast Asia. The Malaysian built B11 Nissan Sunny 130Y used the E13 until at least 1996.

E10
The E10 displaces  from a  bore and stroke, same as for the earlier A10 engine. It was usually fitted to export market Pulsar/Cherrys. The British and Greek markets favoured the smaller E10 as its smaller size meant it avoided higher tax rates at the time. 

Applications:
 1981-1982 Datsun Cherry/100A N10
 1981-1985 Nissan Sunny B11
 1982-1986 Nissan Cherry N12
 1986-1990 Nissan Cherry/Sunny N13 (rebadged Pulsar)

The double- barrel carbureted E10S produces .

However, due to the way the E10 was designed, the engine featured a smaller bore and stroke than the other E series engine family, where as the E13, E15 and E16 share the same block and bore size, and use different length connecting rods and crankshaft to change displacement. This meant the E10 had a total redesign. The results of this was an engine with a large bore of 73 mm and a very short stroke of just 59 mm. This is known as an over square design, a design that is specially designed to achieve very high engine speeds. The result is that the E10 engines is able to easily exceed the 6500 rpm redline imposed by Nissan (already 500 rpm more than the E13 could manage). E10 engines fitted with performance valve springs and oil pump have been known to rev as high as 8000 rpm.

E13
The E13 produces , while the twin-carb E13S produces ,  JIS in the Japanese market. The numbers have changed considerably, depending on when and where the engines were sold.

Applications:
 Nissan Pulsar (N10) (also sold as the Datsun Cherry)
 Nissan Sunny (B11) (sold as Sunny 130Y in Malaysia into the early 1990s)
 Nissan Pulsar/Cherry (N12)
 1982.10–1990.10 Nissan AD Van (VB11) (also sold as the Datsun/Cherry/Pulsar AD Van)

E15
Aside from a single-carbureted version, there was also the twin-carb E15S, fuel injected E15E, and Turbo EFi E15ET. The turbocharged E15ET was discontinued in 1987. It was sold in Japan, Oceania, and in the United States for 1983 and 1984. Note that the E15 is an engine with "interference valve gear".

Outputs (Japan, JIS)
The E15 produces  DIN, or  SAE net in North American specifications
The E15S produces 
The E15E produces 
The E15ET produces 

Claimed power outputs have varied considerably over time and in different markets.

Applications:
 E15/E15S
 1982.10–1990.10 Nissan AD van (VB11)
 Nissan Cherry (N12)
 Nissan Prairie (M10)
 Nissan Pulsar/Cherry/Datsun 310 (N10)
 Nissan Pulsar (N12)
 1982–1983 Nissan Sentra (B11)
 Nissan Sunny (B11)
 Nissan S-Cargo
 E15ET
 Nissan Pulsar ET/EXA/Cherry/Langley GT/Sunny LePrix Turbo

E16
The E16 is a  engine produced from 1982 through 1988. It has a  bore and stroke. The first generation of this engine used a valve cover that bolted to the rocker shaft studs. This design was replaced in September 1986 with a valve cover that bolted to the head. Note that the E16 is an engine with "interference valve gear".

Applications:
 Nissan Sentra (B12)
 Nissan Sunny/Hikari (B12)
 Nissan Sentra/Tsuru/V16 (B13)
 Nissan Prairie (M10) (UK-spec)
 Nissan EXA/Pulsar NX (N13)
 Nissan Pulsar (N13)

E16ST
Produced in Mexico from 1987-1989, used in the Ninja Turbo and Hikari Turbo. Nissan adapted the turbocharger from the E15ET to the E16 engine using a Solex 32 DIS pressurized carburetor (same as the Renault 5 GT Turbo) with a new air pressure system using a fuel regulator and a module to control solenoids which were connected to the vacuum and pressure ports of the carburetor. The compression ratio of the engine was 8.3:1. The head gasket and the head were the same as the E15ET, with better air flow than the NA heads.

Applications:
 Nissan Ninja Turbo (1987)
 Nissan Hikari Turbo (Sunny B12 Coupé, 1988-1989)

See also
 List of Nissan engines
 Tokyu Kogyo Kurogane

References 

E
Gasoline engines by model
Straight-four engines